Ikon is an alternate spelling of icon, and the normal spelling in German and many other languages.

Ikon or iKON may also refer to:

Arts, entertainment, and media

Music

 iKON, a South Korean hip hop group under 143 Entertainment
 Ikon (Australian band), an Australian dark wave group
 Ikon (record label), a Russian record label
 Ikon Asean, a singing competition between Indonesia, Malaysia, and the Philippines
 Ikons, a box set featuring material recorded by the American hard rock band Kiss
 The Ikons, an early name of the Canadian band 13 Engines
 "The Ikon", instrumental suite in Todd Rundgren's Utopia
 Ikon the Verbal Hologram, former stage name of rapper Vinnie Paz

Other media
 Ikon, a 1982 novel by Graham Masterton
 Ikon FCL, the video sublabel of Factory Records
 Interkerkelijke Omroep Nederland, abbreviated as IKON, a Dutch public broadcaster

Brands and enterprises
 Ford Ikon, a sedan version of the Ford Fiesta automobile
 Ikon Gallery, or "The Ikon", a modern art gallery in Birmingham, England
 IKON Office Solutions, a document management company
 IKON Pass, a multi ski resort season pass sold by Alterra Mountain Company
 Zeiss Ikon, a German optics company

See also
Icon (disambiguation)